Kim Bong-jun is a South Korean former professional boxer who competed from 1983 to 1994. He held the WBA minimumweight title from 1989 to 1991.

Professional career

Kim turned professional in 1983 and compiled a record of 14-4-3 before unsuccessfully challenging Venezuelan boxer Leo Gámez, for the inaugural WBA minimumweight title. He would get another shot at the title one year later, the result would be different this time however as he stopped Colombian challenger Agustin Garcia, in the seventh round to become world champion. He would go on to defend the title five times before losing it to compatriot Choi Hi-yong in 1991. In his next fight Kim would move up to the light flyweight division and challenge WBA champion Hiroki Ioka for the title, which he lost via unanimous decision. Kim retired two years after this fight.

Professional boxing record

See also
List of Korean boxers
List of world mini-flyweight boxing champions

References

External links

 

|-

Year of birth missing (living people)
Date of birth missing (living people)
Living people
South Korean male boxers
Light-flyweight boxers
World mini-flyweight boxing champions
World Boxing Association champions